Putere  is a village and rural community in the Wairoa District of the Hawke's Bay Region, on New Zealand's North Island. It is located around the small Lake Rotoroa and Lake Rotonuiaha. The main road to Putere runs from Raupunga on State Highway 2.

A European sheep farming station, Te Putere Grazing Run, was established in the area in 1875 or 1876. The area was also farmed by the families of World War I soldiers, but conditions were severe and many families had abandoned their farms by the Great Depression.

Marae

Te Maara a Ngata marae and meeting house is a meeting place of the Ngāti Kahungunu hapū of Ngāti Pāhauwera.

Putere marae and meeting house is a meeting place of Tūhoe and the  Ngāti Ruapani hapū of Ngati Hinekura, Pukehore and Tuwai.  It is also associated with the Ngāti Kahungunu hapū of Ngāti Pāhauwera, Ruapani.

In October 2020, the Government committed $1,949,075 from the Provincial Growth Fund to upgrade Putere and 23 other Ngāti Kahungunu marae, creating 164 jobs. It also committed to $1,646,820 towards improvements of Putere and five other marae, creating 10 jobs.

Education

Putere School is a Year 1–8 co-educational state primary school established in 1925.

References

Wairoa District
Populated places in the Hawke's Bay Region